Ramiz Myftar Çobaj is a member of the Assembly of the Republic of Albania for the Democratic Party of Albania. He replaced Gëzim Dibra, who died in office.

References

Living people
Democratic Party of Albania politicians
Members of the Parliament of Albania
21st-century Albanian politicians
Year of birth missing (living people)